Weston Wildlife Management Area is a  Wildlife Management Area (WMA) in Fauquier County, Virginia, near the town of Casanova.  Although small in size compared to other WMAs in the state, it nevertheless features a variety of habitats, including hardwood forests along Turkey Run.  Former tracts of farmland are reverting to cedar thickets, and there are a number of fields around the area as well, divided by well-maintained hedgerows.  Turkey Run provides a water supply year-round, and forms the eastern boundary of the property.  Within the area's boundaries is a  parcel of privately owned land.

Weston WMA is owned and maintained by the Virginia Department of Game and Inland Fisheries. The area is open to the public for fishing, hiking, horseback riding, and primitive camping. Firearms are not permitted, although a "chase-only" season is available for training hunting hounds. Access for persons 17 years of age or older requires a valid hunting or fishing permit, or a WMA access permit.

See also
 List of Virginia Wildlife Management Areas

References

External links
Virginia Department of Game and Inland Fisheries: Weston Wildlife Management Area

Wildlife management areas of Virginia
Protected areas of Fauquier County, Virginia
1959 establishments in Virginia
Protected areas established in 1959